Philip Kenneth Collen (born 8 December 1957) is an English musician who is best known as the co-lead guitarist for the rock band Def Leppard, joining the band in 1982 during the recording of the Pyromania album.  Prior to joining Def Leppard, Collen had performed with a number of bands in the burgeoning British glam metal scene.  Outside of Def Leppard, with which he still records and performs live, he has been involved in a number of side projects most notably the trio Man Raze, with which he is the lead singer and sole guitarist.

Early life 
Collen was born in Hackney, London. He got his first guitar, a red Gibson SG, on his 16th birthday, and taught himself how to play. He played with several bands including Lucy, Tush, and Dumb Blondes.

He left school to work as a motorcycle dispatch rider for a type setters until his band Girl got their first record contract. During his tenure with Girl, Collen's career began rising, spurred by the relative success of the albums Sheer Greed and Wasted Youth, which allowed him the opportunity to play at more significant venues.

A young Collen can also be seen on the back cover of Deep Purple's live album Made in Japan as the live photo was actually taken at the Rainbow Theatre in London, a concert Collen attended, and not in Japan.

In a recent interview, Collen revealed that he was approached by Steve Harris to join Iron Maiden replacing guitarist Dennis Stratton.

Def Leppard 

Before Collen joined Def Leppard on 13 July 1982 during the recording of Pyromania, he had previously been asked to consider joining the band during the 1981 tour for High 'n' Dry by Joe Elliott and Steve Clark, whom he knew at the time. Despite this invitation, there was no need to replace Pete Willis. As a result, Collen stayed as a member of Girl.

Recruitment and friendship with Steve Clark 
After Willis was fired due to alcohol problems, Joe Elliott called and asked Collen to audition. He was asked to perform the solos on the songs "Stagefright" and "Photograph" during the recording sessions of Pyromania. Mutt Lange, the band's producer, said to Collen, "just have fun on it, play some solos on it". "Photograph", "Rock of Ages", "Foolin, "Stagefright", and "Rock Till You Drop" were all songs that he played solos on. He and fellow guitarist Clark quickly bonded, becoming close friends and leading to the trademark dual-guitar sound of Def Leppard. Collen and Clark became known as the "Terror Twins", in recognition of their talents and hard drinking lifestyles. By this time, Collen had also become noted for his trademark bare-chested stage appearances.

Changes in lifestyle, death of Clark and Adrenalize sessions 
In 1988, Collen quit drinking alcohol, which had developed into a serious addiction, stopped eating meat and adopted a generally healthy lifestyle. According to Collen, he began suffering from blackouts due to alcohol and quit when he realized that he was losing control of his addiction, which was starting to dominate his life. In contrast, Clark did not follow such standards and died due to alcohol abuse in early 1991.

After Clark died, Collen was faced with the challenge of not only dealing with the loss of a friend and bandmate but also with the burden and responsibility of the Adrenalize recordings. The music had already been written but Clark's playing style differed so much from Collen's that recording Clark's parts proved very difficult. While Clark's playing style was rhythmic, melodic and sometimes even characterized as "sloppy", Collen's style was technical and precise, leading to difficulties in mimicking the sound of Clark's playing style.  Due to the aftermath of Clark's death, as well as the issues with the recording of Adrenalize, Collen seriously considered leaving Def Leppard. According to Joe Elliott, Collen did not want to continue in the band with Clark not being there. He said, "I'd rather be a plumber."

Clark would ultimately be replaced as the band's co-lead guitarist by Vivian Campbell, formerly of Dio and Whitesnake, shortly before the Adrenalize tour. This relieved Collen of some of the pressures of the "overkill" production style of Def Leppard, as well as the challenge of reproducing Clark's guitar parts for live shows.

Side projects 

Collen has been involved in several side projects over his career, most notably the band Man Raze, formed as a joint collaboration with former Girl bandmate Simon Laffy as bassist and drummer Paul Cook from the Sex Pistols.

Collen played lead guitar on Donny Osmond's song Just Between You and Me in 1990. Due to his band disapproving of him playing on this song, he was credited as Rory James Collen on the track.

In 1990, Collen co-produced the On the Edge album of the Australian band BB Steal.

In 1991, Collen offered a song he had written, "Miss You in a Heartbeat" to the band The Law, which was featured on the band's self-titled album. This album was the band's only release. "Miss You in a Heartbeat" was later recorded and released by Def Leppard.

In 1993, Collen executive produced the album Sublime to the Ridiculous for the band, Sheer Greed, composed of former members of Girl, an act Collen was also associated earlier in his career.

Collen has also worked in side projects with Def Leppard singer Joe Elliott. One of these recent projects was a tribute to David Bowie and Mick Ronson.  He and Elliott also joined with Trevor Bolder and Mick "Woody" Woodmansey from Spiders from Mars and keyboardist Dick Decent to form the band Cybernauts.  In 2001 they released a live album of Bowie songs.

In 1996, Collen performed as a featured guitarist on the Jeffology: A Guitar Chronicle album – a tribute album to Jeff Beck. Collen performed on the single, "'Cause We've Ended As Lovers" from the album.

In 2010, Collen recorded the song "Hard Times Celebrate" with rapper Bazaar Royale, featured on the album "The Ride."

Collen formed a blues project by the name of Delta Deep with vocalist Debbi Blackwell Cook of the 1980s group The Jammers, which released an eponymous debut album in 2015.

In 2017, Collen was featured on three tracks of the reunited The Professionals album "What in the World."

Collen joined Joe Satriani and John Petrucci on the 2018 edition of the G3 Tour in the United States.

Personal life 
Collen has lived in the United States for 25 years and currently resides in Orange County, California. He commented, "I'm almost a California native now." He has five children: Rory (born 1990), Samantha (born 2004), Savannah (born 2009), Charlotte (born 2014) and Jaxson (born 2018). He was married to Jacqueline Collen-Tarolly (1989) and Anita Thomas-Collen (1999). He married actress and costume designer Helen L. Simmons in 2010.

Collen is a vegan and has been a vegetarian for 35 years. Collen is also colorblind.

Collen has been training extensively in martial arts for over 20 years. He began his martial arts training in Kempo Karate, earning a black belt. He also has studied kickboxing with Benny Urquidez and Muay Thai with Jean Carillo. He currently works out off and on tour with Eric the Trainer.

Equipment 
In 1989, Collen worked with Jackson Guitars to develop the Jackson PC1, an "ergonomically correct" electric guitar, although according to Collen, he designed them because "they looked cool", and they ended up having bad balance, as well as a "really weird shape".

, his live rig with Def Leppard consists of various Jackson PC1 guitars (some modified), all equipped with DiMarzio pickups, Floyd Rose tremolo units, and a Floyd Rose sustainer driver. Collen uses several Fender acoustic guitars.  Collen uses D'Addario 0.13–0.54 and 0.13–0.56 gauge strings, and he uses steel picks.

Discography

With Girl 
Sheer Greed (1980)
Wasted Youth (1981)
Killing Time (1997)
Live at the Marquee (2001)

With Def Leppard 

Pyromania (1983) (tracks 1–3, 6 & 7)
Hysteria (1987)
Adrenalize (1992)
Retro Active (1993)
Slang (1996)
Euphoria (1999)
X (2002)
Yeah! (2006)
Songs from the Sparkle Lounge (2008)
Mirror Ball – Live & More (2011)
Viva! Hysteria (2013)
Def Leppard (2015)
 Diamond Star Halos (2022)

With Man Raze 
 Surreal (2008)
 PunkFunkRootsRock (2011)

With Delta Deep 
 Delta Deep (2015)

References

External links 

 Phil Collen official website
 Man Raze official website
 2006 radio interview with Phil Collen
 The Gauntlet interviews Phil Collen in 2008
 2015 Phil Collen Interview on Guitar.com

1957 births
Living people
English rock guitarists
English heavy metal guitarists
Def Leppard members
Girl (band) members
Man Raze members
People from Hackney Central
English expatriates in the United States
Lead guitarists
Musicians from London